David Michael Tyson is a Canadian rock music producer and songwriter.  He is best known for co-writing Alannah Myles' 1990 #1 hit "Black Velvet" (with Christopher Ward) and producing her debut album.  He also co-wrote three hit songs (with Dean McTaggart) from Amanda Marshall's self-titled 1995 debut album.

Tyson has won three Juno Awards for his work, mainly in the 1990s.  Most notably he was awarded the "Producer of the Year" in 1991 for his work on Jude Cole's A View from 3rd Street album, and "Songwriter of the Year" for his work with Hall & Oates.

Partial Production discography
 1981: Eddie Schwartz - No Refuge - co-producer with Schwartz, as well as co-writer, keyboards
 1984: Eddie Schwartz - Public Life - co-producer with Schwartz, as well as co-writer, keyboards, bass, glockenspiel, backing vocals
 1984: The Arrows - Stand Back - also co-writer, keyboards
 1986: The Arrows - The Lines Are Open
 1989: Alannah Myles - Alannah Myles
 1990: Jude Cole - A View from 3rd Street - also keyboards, arrangement
 1992: Alannah Myles - Rockinghorse 1992: Peter Cetera - World Falling Down 1995: Amanda Marshall - Amanda Marshall 1994: Tina Arena - Don't Ask - also co-writer
 1997: Tina Arena - In Deep - also co-writer, keyboards
 2000: Billie Myers - Vertigo - also co-writer
 2001: Point of Grace - Free to Fly 2016: Heather Rankin - A Fine Line - also co-writer

Awards
 1984 - Nominated - Juno Award for Producer of the Year - for Stand Back 1986 - Nominated - Juno Award for Producer of the Year - for The Lines Are Open 1990 - Winner - Juno Award for Composer of the Year - for "Black Velvet" (with Christopher Ward)
 1990 - Nominated - Juno Award for Producer of the Year - for Alannah Myles 1991 - Winner - Juno Award for Songwriter of the Year - for Jude Cole's A View from 3rd Street and Hall & Oates' "Don't Hold Back Your Love"
 1991 - Winner - Juno Award for Producer of the Year - for Jude Cole's A View from 3rd Street 1993 - Nominated - Juno Award for Producer of the Year - for Alannah Myles' Rockinghorse 1995 - Producer of ARIA Album of the Year - for Tina Arena's Don't Ask 1996 - Nominated - Juno Award for Producer of the Year - for Amanda Marshall''
 1998 - Nominated - Juno Award for Songwriter of the Year - for "Dark Horse" (with Dean McTaggart & Amanda Marshall), "Beautiful Goodbye" (with Christopher Ward), "Trust Me This Is Love" (with Dean McTaggart) by Amanda Marshall
 2003 - Won an International Achievement Award for the song "Begin With Me" at the SOCAN Awards in Toronto.

References

 Dean McTaggart Biography

External links
 Express Artists - Management for David Tyson

Canadian record producers
Canadian songwriters
Year of birth missing (living people)
Living people
Juno Award for Songwriter of the Year winners
Jack Richardson Producer of the Year Award winners